Hacılar, Azerbaijan may refer to:
Hacılar, Agdash
Hacılar, Aghjabadi
Hacılar, Barda
Hacılar, Gadabay
Hacılar, Khachmaz
Hacılar, Lachin
Hacılar, Tovuz